Inessa Shalvovna Abesadze  (born 1940) is a Soviet and Georgian theater and film actress.

He was born in 1940 in Tbilisi. Graduated from the Faculty of Film Actors of the Shota Rustaveli Theatre and Film University.
 
Wife of actor Elguja Burduli. They have three children:

Lado (born 1964), one of the pioneers of Georgian alternative music;
Maka (born 1965), actor, documentary film director;
Bakuri (born 1975), rock musician.

Filmography 
 1981:  Swimmer  (episode) dir. Irakli Kvirikadze
 1989:  Holiday in Anticipation of the Holiday  (episode) dir. Leila Gordeladze

References

External links
  Inessa Abesadze // KinoPoisk (in Russian)

1940 births
Living people
Soviet film actresses
Film actresses from Georgia (country)
Actors from Tbilisi
20th-century actresses from Georgia (country)
21st-century actresses from Georgia (country)
Stage actresses from Georgia (country)
Soviet stage actresses